10 Minutes is a 2002 short film contrasting ten minutes in the life of a Japanese tourist in Rome with the bloody drama of a Bosnian family taking place at the same time less than an hour away in the besieged city of Sarajevo during the Bosnian War. It was directed by Ahmed Imamović.

Cast 
Elmedin Leleta as Kid (as Almedin Leleta)
Satoshi Yahata as Tourist
Milan Pavlović as Shopkeeper
Jasna Žalica as Mother
Izudin Bajrović as Father
Admir Glamočak as Atko
Enis Bešlagić as Soldier 1
Elmir Jukić as Soldier 2
Sanja Burić as Sanja
Advan Tabaković as Kid playing football

Awards
The film was awarded Best short film of 2002 by the European Film Academy.

References

External links 
 

2002 films
American short films